Advance Thun SA is a Swiss aircraft manufacturer based in Thun. The company specializes in the design and manufacture of paragliders, harnesses, paragliding carrying bags and paragliding clothing.

Advance is a société anonyme, a share-held company.

The company is one of the world's leading manufacturers of paragliders. They produce a full line of paragliders ranging from training to competition gliders. Many of their glider models have been developed over successive generations of refinements. Gliders include the beginner Advance Alpha, the intermediate Epsilon and Sigma as well as the competition Omega and the two-place Advance Bi Beta.

The 2015 Red Bull X-Alps competition was won by Chrigel Maurer (first) and Sebastian Huber (second), both flying Advance Omega XAlps gliders. They flew  over seven days of bivouac flying.

Aircraft

References

External links

Aircraft manufacturers of Switzerland
Paragliders